Park Jae-bum (born 23 February 1982) is a South Korean professional golfer.

Park has played on the Japan Golf Tour since 2010. He won his first title at the 2011 Japan Golf Tour Championship Citibank Cup Shishido Hills.

Professional wins (2)

Japan Golf Tour wins (1)

Korean Tour wins (1)

Results in major championships

CUT = missed the halfway cut
"T" indicates a tie for a place
Note: Park never played in the Masters Tournament or the PGA Championship.

Results in World Golf Championships

References

External links

South Korean male golfers
Japan Golf Tour golfers
1982 births
Living people